Stephen T. Levin (born December 3, 1981) is an American non-profit executive and politician. He is the CEO of Solar One, a green energy advocacy not-for-profit and the former New York City Councilmember for the 33rd district.

Early life and education
Levin grew up in Plainfield, New Jersey. Related to former U.S. Senator Carl Levin of Michigan, and former Congressman Sander Levin from Michigan's 9th congressional district, he graduated from Brown University with a degree in Classics and Comparative Literature.

Career
He moved to Brooklyn and began his career working with the Lead Safe House Program at the Ridgewood Bushwick Senior Citizens Council. In 2006 he went to work as chief of staff to New York State Assemblymember Vito Lopez.

Levin was arrested, along with Public Advocate Bill de Blasio, as an act of civil disobedience in protest of the closure of Long Island College Hospital in Brooklyn. He delivered 7,000 petitions to SUNY officials there demanding that the hospital stay open.

In September 2010, he was named one of City & State's "40 under 40" for being a young influential member of New York City politics.

New York City Council
Levin was elected to replace David Yassky, who vacated the position to run for New York City Comptroller, in a competitive seven-way race with the support of Assemblyman Vito Lopez. Lopez helped him secure endorsements from the United Federation of Teachers (UFT), DC 37, the Working Families Party, the New York League of Conservation Voters, Senator Charles Schumer, Brooklyn Borough President Marty Markowitz, and Congresswoman Carolyn Maloney. Most importantly, Lopez secured for his former employee the support of the Zaloni faction of the Jewish Satmar community in Williamsburg. That Hasidic faction provided Levin with his margin of victory in 2009.

In 2013, Levin introduced participatory budgeting, a democratic process in which community members directly decide how to spend part of a public budget, to his district. At that time, Levin was one of eight members of the City Council to offer participatory budgeting to his constituents.

Levin originally opposed the Rose Plaza housing complex on the Williamsburg waterfront. The project initially called for 20 percent affordable housing and 30 three-bedroom apartments. He then voted for the project when the developer agreed to build 60 three-bedroom apartments and 14 four-bedroom apartments, all priced below the market rate. The development passed in council 18-1. Levin also negotiated an agreement with the Community Preservation Corporation Resources (CPCR) over the Domino Sugar factory redevelopment plan. He has also worked with Assemblyman Lopez to seek federal subsidies for public housing developments in Brooklyn.

Levin introduced a bill to reduce fines for street food vendors over procedural violations. The bill passed at the City Council on February 27, 2013, and reduced regulations for them.

Levin is term-limited and could not run for re-election in 2021. His term on the City Council ended on January 1, 2022.

Solar One
In his post City Council career, he has taken on the role of CEO of Solar One.

Personal life
Levin resides in Greenpoint, Brooklyn with his wife and children.

Election history

References

External links
Official NYC Council website

1981 births
21st-century American politicians
Brown University alumni
Living people
New York (state) Democrats
New York City Council members
People from Greenpoint, Brooklyn
Politicians from Brooklyn
Politicians from Plainfield, New Jersey
Levin family